Revally is a mandal and village in Wanaparthy district, Telangana, India.

Villages 
The villages in Chinnambavi mandal include:

 Bandaraipakula
 Chennaram
 Kesampeta
 Shanaipalle
 Thalpunur
 Cheerkapalle
 Nagapur
 Revally
 Vallabhanpalle
 Konkalapalle

References 

Mandals in Wanaparthy district
Wanaparthy district
Census towns in Wanaparthy district